Brachys is a genus of metallic wood-boring beetles in the family Buprestidae. There are at least 140 described species in Brachys.

See also
 List of Brachys species

References

Buprestidae genera